The Kåkern Bridge is a cantilever road bridge that crosses the Kåkernsundet strait between the islands of Flakstadøya and Moskenesøya in the municipality of Flakstad in Nordland county, Norway. The Kåkern Bridge is one of the many bridges that connect the islands of the Lofoten archipelago to each other. The Fredvang Bridges are the only other bridge connection between Flakstadøya and Moskenesøya.

History

The present Kåkern Bridge replaced an older suspension bridge.

See also
List of bridges in Norway
List of bridges in Norway by length
List of bridges
List of bridges by length

References

External links
Picture of the old Kåkern Bridge

Flakstad
Road bridges in Nordland
Bridges completed in 2002
Bridges completed in 1961
1961 establishments in Norway
2002 establishments in Norway
Roads within the Arctic Circle